= Thee Exciters =

British garage rock band

Thee Exciters are a garage rock music group from Southampton, England.

== Group Members ==
- Paul le Brock - Vocals
- Justin Cunningham - Guitar
- Alex Tapp - Bass
- Richie Walker - drums

== History ==
Thee Exciters were formed in Southampton, England in 2003. Originally called The Mood, The original lineup included Lee Tea on bass and Ken Robshaw on drums. Ken left the band to and was replaced by Richie Walker in 2006 and Lee left the band in 2007, moving to Malmo, Sweden where he formed the band The Branded. The position of Bass was then taken up by Alex Tapp. At this time the band was just about to release the highly acclaimed album Spending Cash, Talking Trash.

== Discography ==
- "Johnny's Too Messed Up" (Delincuentes Records) 2004
- "Dial 'E' For Excitement" EP (Dirty Water Records) 2006
- Spending Cash, Talking Trash LP (Dirty Water Records) 2008
- "Perpetual Happening", (Dirty Water Records) 2010

== Tours ==
- US Tour 2006
- Spanish Tour 2006
